This article is about the demographic features of the population of Bosnia and Herzegovina, including population density, ethnicity, education level, health of the populace, economic status,  religious affiliations and other aspects of the population.

Demographic characteristics

Population

Vital statistics

Source: Agency for Statistics of Bosnia and Herzegovina

*No data for the period 1992-1995

Current vital statistics

Vital statistics by entity

Federation of Bosnia and Herzegovina

Source: Institute for Statistics of the Federation of Bosnia and Herzegovina

Current vital statistics

Republika Srpska

Source: Republika Srpska Institute of Statistics

Current vital statistics

Brčko District

Source: Agency for Statistics of Bosnia and Herzegovina - Statistics of the Brčko District BiH

Current vital statistics

Marriages and divorces

Federation of Bosnia and Herzegovina

Republika Srpska

Brčko District

Life expectancy at birth in Bosnia and Herzegovina

Ethnic groups 

According to data from the 2013 census published by the Agency for Statistics of Bosnia and Herzegovina, Bosniaks constitute 50.11% of the population, Bosnian Serbs 30.78%, Bosnian Croats 15.43%, and others form 2.73%, with the remaining respondents not declaring their ethnicity or not answering.

The census results are contested by the Republika Srpska statistical office and by Bosnian Serb politicians, who oppose the inclusion of non-permanent Bosnian residents in the figures.

The European Union's statistics office, Eurostat, determined that the methodology used by the Bosnian statistical agency was in line with international recommendations.

In Bosnia and Herzegovina, religion is often linked to ethnicity, i.e. (with the exception of agnostics and atheists) most Bosniaks are Muslim, Serbs are Orthodox Christian, and Croats are Roman Catholic.

Languages 
Bosnia's constitution does not specify any official languages; however, academics Hilary Footitt and Michael Kelly note that the Dayton Agreement states that it is "done in Bosnian, Croatian, English and Serbian", and they describe this as the "de facto recognition of three official languages" at the state level. The equal status of Bosnian, Serbian and Croatian was verified by the Constitutional Court in 2000. It ruled that the provisions of the Federation and Republika Srpska constitutions on language were incompatible with the state constitution, since they only recognised "Bosniak" and Croatian (in the case of the Federation) and Serbian (in the case of Republika Srpska) as official languages at the entity level.

As a result, the wording of the entity constitutions was changed and all three languages were made official in both entities. The three languages are mutually intelligible and are also known collectively as Serbo-Croatian. Use of one of the three varieties has become a marker of ethnic identity. Michael Kelly and Catherine Baker argue: "The three official languages of today's Bosnian state...represent the symbolic assertion of national identity over the pragmatism of mutual intelligibility".

All standard varieties are based on the Ijekavian varieties of the Shtokavian dialect (non-standard spoken varieties including, beside Ijekavian, also Ikavian Shtokavian). Serbian and Bosnian are written in both Latin and Cyrillic (the latter predominantly using the Latin script), whereas Croatian is written only in Latin alphabet. There are also some speakers of Italian, German, Turkish and Ladino. Yugoslav Sign Language is used with Croatian and Serbian variants.

According to the results of the 2013 census, 52.86% of the population consider their mother tongue to be Bosnian, 30.76% Serbian, 14.6% Croatian and 1.57% another language, with 0.21% not giving an answer.

Religion 

According to the 2013 census, 50.7% of the population identify religiously as Muslim, 30.75% as Serbian Orthodox Christian, 15.19% as Roman Catholic, 1.15% as other, 1.1% as agnostic or atheist, with the remainder not declaring their religion or not answering. A 2012 survey found that 47% of Bosnia's Muslims are non-denominational Muslims, while 45% follow Sunnism.
In Bosnia and Herzegovina, religion is strongly linked to ethnicity.

Demographic statistics 

The following demographic statistics are from the CIA World Factbook, unless otherwise indicated.

Population
3,378,821

Age structure
0-14 years: 13.18% (male 261,430/female 244,242)
15-24 years: 10.83% (male 214,319/female 201,214)
25-54 years: 44.52% (male 859,509/female 848,071)
55-64 years: 15.24% (male 284,415/female 300,168)
65 years and over: 16.22% (male 249,624/female 372,594) (2020 est.)

Median age
Total: 43.3 years
Male: 41.6 years
Female: 44.8 years (2020 est.)

Sex ratio
At birth: 1.07 male(s)/female
0-14 years: 1.07 male(s)/female
15-24 years: 1.07 male(s)/female
25-54 years: 1.01 male(s)/female
55-64 years: 0.95 male(s)/female
65 years and over: 0.67 male(s)/female
Total population: 0.95 male(s)/female (2020 est.)

Infant mortality rate
Total: 5.32 deaths/1,000 live births
Male: 5.44 deaths/1,000 live births
Female: 5.19 deaths/1,000 live births (2021 est.)

Life expectancy at birth
Total population: 77.74 years
Male: 74.76 years
Female: 80.93 years (2021 est.)

HIV/AIDS
Adult prevalence rate: less than 0.1% (2018)
People living with HIV/AIDS: Less than 500 (2018)
Deaths: less than 100 (2018)

Literacy
Definition: age 15 and over can read and write
Total population: 98.5%
Male: 99.5%
Female: 97.5% (2015 est.)

See also
 Demographic history of Bosnia and Herzegovina
 
 Demographics of the Kingdom of Yugoslavia
 Demographics of the Socialist Federal Republic of Yugoslavia
 Demographics of Croatia
 Demographics of Montenegro
 Demographics of Serbia
 Bosnia and Herzegovina
 Federation of Bosnia and Herzegovina
 Republika Srpska
 Brčko District
 List of Bosnians and Herzegovinians

Religion:
 Islam in Bosnia and Herzegovina
 Serbian Orthodox Church
 Roman Catholicism in Bosnia and Herzegovina
 Jews in Bosnia and Herzegovina

Groups:
 Ethnic groups in Bosnia and Herzegovina
 Roma in Bosnia and Herzegovina

References

External links

Living standard measurement survey 2001

 
Demographics of Yugoslavia